Santo Tomas, officially the Municipality of Santo Tomas, is a 5th class municipality in the province of Pangasinan, Philippines. According to the 2020 census, it has a population of 14,878 people.

Geography

Barangays
Santo Tomas is politically subdivided into 10 barangays. These barangays are headed by elected officials: Barangay Captain, Barangay Council, whose members are called Barangay Councilors. All are elected every three years.
 La Luna
 Poblacion East
 Poblacion West
 Salvacion
 San Agustin
 San Antonio
 San Jose
 San Marcos
 Santo Domingo
 Santo Niño

Climate

Demographics

Religion

St. Thomas Aquinas Parish Church

The 1973 St. Thomas Aquinas Parish (F-1973) Church (Barangay Santo Domingo) is under the  Roman Catholic Diocese of Urdaneta and the Vicariate of Sacred Heart (Vicar Forane is Father Hurley John S. Solfelix). Its Feast Day is January 28, the same feast day of the Church's patron and the town's patron, St. Thomas Aquinas. The current Parish Priest is Father Jun Guerrero Laya. As a parish, Santo Tomas was erected on March 15, 1974, by Archbishop Federico Limon consecrated the Church on March 15, 1974, since before, Santo Tomas Church was merely a "visita” or chapel of Alcala, Pangasinan, while the town was a barrio of Alcala (from 1898 until the 1901 fusion with Alcala), with former name of Arango  (“inarang”, fresh water shells at Agno River).

Before 1898, Santo Tomas was a barrio of Alcala. Arango was its name as a barrio, Such a name derived from “inarang”, a name given to the fresh water shells which abound near the bank of the Agno river. Santo Tomas was recreated as a town in 1908.

Economy 

The town's principal products are palay, yellow corn, coconut, tobacco, poultry and livestock.

Government
Santo Tomas, belonging to the fifth congressional district of the province of Pangasinan, is governed by a mayor designated as its local chief executive and by a municipal council as its legislative body in accordance with the Local Government Code. The mayor, vice mayor, and the councilors are elected directly by the people through an election which is being held every three years.

Elected officials

Guinness World Records

On February 11, 2008, during first Corn Festival of the centennial celebration, Santo Tomas got the Guinness World Records certificate for longest barbecue. Santo Tomas' longest barbecue record beat the previous record of  set in Montevideo, Uruguay (grilled red meat).

On February 11, 2009, Santo Tomas'  Second Corn Festival's 200-meter (stretch of the street) corn grill was held for its 101st founding anniversary. at it previously held its 2007 Santo Tomas Corn Festival.

In the "Agew na Pangasinan 2012 Street Dancers Showdown", April 11, 2012 Pangasinan Day amid the Float Parade and Street Dancing Contest,  Santo. Tomas Street Dancers demonstrated their Guinness entry: “the biggest grill in the world”.
On the 2012 Corn Festival, March 26, Santo Tomas, Pangasinan grilled 6,000 ears of corn for the town's 103rd founding anniversary yesterday.

Gallery

References

External links

 Santo Tomas Profile at PhilAtlas.com
  Municipal Profile at the National Competitiveness Council of the Philippines
 Santo Tomas at the Pangasinan Government Website
 Local Governance Performance Management System
 [ Philippine Standard Geographic Code]
 Philippine Census Information

Municipalities of Pangasinan
Populated places on the Agno River